"Mama" (stylized in all caps) is a song by American rapper 6ix9ine from his debut studio album, Dummy Boy (2018). It features Nicki Minaj and Kanye West. Shooting began for a music video, but was not finished.

Music video
The three artists were supposed to film a music video for the track in Beverly Hills, but it was never finished due to a shooting on set, though none of them were injured. Surveillance footage showed gunmen firing on the set. November 16th 2018 6ix9ine claimed while visiting The Breakfast Club that the video had "already been shot", but two days later he was set to show up to shoot additional footage for the video but was arrested instead on racketeering charges. Since no word have come out of the video since the arrest it has been indicated that it has been scrapped.

Commercial performance
"Mama" debuted at number 68 on the UK Singles Chart upon the release of Dummy Boy. Within the same week, it reached number 43 on the US Billboard Hot 100 and number 51 on the Canadian Hot 100 and rose to its peak of number 16 in Canada the next week. "Mama" performed best in Slovakia, charting at number 11 on the Singles Digitál Top 100.

Charts

Certifications

References

2018 songs
6ix9ine songs
Kanye West songs
Nicki Minaj songs
Song recordings produced by Murda Beatz
Songs written by 6ix9ine
Songs written by Consequence (rapper)
Songs written by Kanye West
Songs written by Murda Beatz
Songs written by Nicki Minaj